Halloween II is a soundtrack by John Carpenter for the 1981 film of the same name. It was released in 1981 through Varèse Sarabande. An expanded 30th Anniversary Edition was released in 2009 through Alan Howarth Incorporated.

Track listing

Personnel
 John Carpenter – composition, performance
 Alan Howarth - synthesizer programming, sequencing, editing, recording, production

References

John Carpenter soundtracks
1981 soundtrack albums
Horror film soundtracks
Film scores
Varèse Sarabande soundtracks
Halloween albums
Halloween (franchise) soundtracks